Jaeden Martell (né Lieberher; born January 4, 2003) is an American actor. He played the role of Bill Denbrough in the 2017 film adaptation of Stephen King's novel It and reprised the role in the film's 2019 sequel. He also appeared in the mystery film Knives Out (2019) and starred in the miniseries Defending Jacob (2020).

Early life
Martell was born on January 4, 2003, in Philadelphia, Pennsylvania, the son of Wes Lieberher, a Los Angeles–based executive chef, and Angela Teresa Martell. His maternal grandmother, Chisun Martell, is Korean. He lived in South Philadelphia until the age of eight, when he moved to Los Angeles.

Career 
In the first six years of his career, Martell was credited almost exclusively under his family name, Lieberher. In 2019, he switched to his mother's maiden name, Martell.

Martell's first acting role was in a commercial for Hot Wheels. He appeared in several other commercials after that, including Google, Moneysupermarket.com, Liberty Mutual, Hyundai (for the 2013 Super Bowl), Verizon Fios and General Electric. His first major feature film role was in 2014's St. Vincent, where he starred alongside Bill Murray. Murray later recommended Martell to Cameron Crowe for the director's 2015 film Aloha. He played the title character in the 2017 film The Book of Henry. Martell received further recognition for his starring role as Bill Denbrough in the 2017 supernatural horror film It and its 2019 follow-up It Chapter Two.

In 2019, Martell was also a part of Rian Johnson's ensemble cast in the murder-mystery film Knives Out. In March 2019, now credited as Martell, he joined the cast of the Apple miniseries Defending Jacob, based on the William Landay novel of the same name. On April 30, 2020, in an Instagram Live interview with Teen Vogue, Martell confirmed that he had joined the cast of Tunnels in the role of Grayson Mitchell, the younger sibling of a victim of gun violence. The film does not have a set or confirmed release date.

In September 2021, Martell portrayed Morty Smith in a series of promotional interstitials for the two-part fifth season finale of Rick and Morty. In February 2021, he joined the cast of Netflix's Metal Lords. In October 2022, he portrayed Craig in the Netflix film Mr. Harrigan's Phone written and directed by John Lee Hancock, based on the short story of the same name from the If It Bleeds collection by Stephen King.

Filmography

Film

Television

Accolades

References

External links
 
 
 

2003 births
Living people
American male child actors
American male film actors
American male television actors
American people of Korean descent
Male actors from Philadelphia
21st-century American male actors